The LIX Legislature of the Congress of Mexico met from September 2003 to August 2006. All members of the lower house (Chamber of Deputies) of the Congress were elected in the elections of July 2003 while members of the upper house (Senate) were elected in the elections of July 2000.

Composition

Chamber of Deputies

Senate of Mexico

Senators of the LIX Legislature

By state

Plurinominal senators

Deputies of the LIX Legislature

By relative majority election

Plurinominal Deputies

Elections results

Chamber of deputies

|-
! style="background-color:#E9E9E9;text-align:left;vertical-align:top;" colspan=2|Parties
! style="background-color:#E9E9E9;text-align:right;" |Votes
! style="background-color:#E9E9E9;text-align:right;" |%
! style="background-color:#E9E9E9;text-align:right;" |FPP Seats
! style="background-color:#E9E9E9;text-align:right;" |PR Seats
! style="background-color:#E9E9E9;text-align:right;" |Total
|-
| style="text-align:left;vertical-align:top;" rowspan=3|PRI/PVEM
| style="text-align:left;" |Institutional Revolutionary Party (Partido Revolucionario Institucional)
| style="vertical-align:top;" |
| style="vertical-align:top;" |30.6
| style="vertical-align:top;" |161
| style="vertical-align:top;" |63
| style="vertical-align:top;" |224
|-
| style="text-align:left;" |Ecologist Green Party of Mexico (Partido Verde Ecologista de México)
| style="vertical-align:top;" |
| style="vertical-align:top;" |4.0
| style="vertical-align:top;" |3
| style="vertical-align:top;" |14
| style="vertical-align:top;" |17
|-
| style="text-align:left;" |PRI-PVEM lists
| style="vertical-align:top;" |
| style="vertical-align:top;" |13.4
| style="vertical-align:top;" |
| style="vertical-align:top;" |
| style="vertical-align:top;" |
|-
| style="text-align:left;vertical-align:top;" colspan=2|National Action Party (Partido Acción Nacional)
| style="vertical-align:top;" |
| style="vertical-align:top;" |23.1
| style="vertical-align:top;" |80
| style="vertical-align:top;" |69
| style="vertical-align:top;" |149
|-
| style="text-align:left;vertical-align:top;" colspan=2|Party of the Democratic Revolution (Partido de la Revolución Democrática)
| style="vertical-align:top;" |
| style="vertical-align:top;" |17.6
| style="vertical-align:top;" |56
| style="vertical-align:top;" |41
| style="vertical-align:top;" |97
|-
| style="text-align:left;vertical-align:top;" colspan=2|Labour Party (Partido del Trabajo)
| style="vertical-align:top;" |
| style="vertical-align:top;" |2.4
| style="vertical-align:top;" |0
| style="vertical-align:top;" |6
| style="vertical-align:top;" |6
|-
| style="text-align:left;vertical-align:top;" colspan=2|Convergence for Democracy (Convergencia por la Democracia)
| style="vertical-align:top;" |
| style="vertical-align:top;" |2.3
| style="vertical-align:top;" |0
| style="vertical-align:top;" |5
| style="vertical-align:top;" |5
|-
| style="text-align:left;vertical-align:top;" colspan=2|Independents
|
| style="vertical-align:top;" |
| style="vertical-align:top;" |0
| style="vertical-align:top;" |2
| style="vertical-align:top;" |2
|-
|style="text-align:left;background-color:#E9E9E9" colspan=2|Total
|width="75" style="text-align:right;background-color:#E9E9E9"|
|width="30" style="text-align:right;background-color:#E9E9E9"| 
|width="30" style="text-align:right;background-color:#E9E9E9"|300
|width="30" style="text-align:right;background-color:#E9E9E9"|200
|width="30" style="text-align:right;background-color:#E9E9E9"|500
|-
| style="text-align:left;" colspan=6 |Source: IFE/PREP and Grupa Reforma

Senate of Mexico

External links
Chamber of Deputies website
Chamber of Senators website

Congress of Mexico by session